A Good Woman may refer to:
 A Good Woman (novel), a 2008 novel by Danielle Steel
 A Good Woman (film), a 2004 film directed by Mike Barker, based on the Oscar Wilde play Lady Windermere's Fan
 Good Woman (Gladys Knight album), 1991, or the title track
 Good Woman (The Staves album), 2021
 "Good Woman", a song by American country singer Maren Morris from her 2019 album Girl
 "Good Woman", a song by Cat Power on the 2003 album You Are Free

See also
 The Good Wife (disambiguation)